In Greek mythology, the Hysminae or Hysminai (Ancient Greek: Ὑσμίνας or ὑσμῖναι; singular:  from hysmine means 'battle, conflict, combat') are the personifications of fighting.

Family

Hesiod's account 
The Hysminai are represented as the children of Eris, the goddess of strife. They were siblings to Lethe, Limos, Horkos, Ponos and many other daemons.

 And hateful Eris bore painful Ponos ("Hardship"),
 Lethe ("Forgetfulness") and Limos ("Starvation") and the tearful Algea ("Pains"),
 Hysminai ("Battles"), Makhai ("Wars"), Phonoi ("Murders"), and Androktasiai ("Manslaughters");
 Neikea ("Quarrels"), Pseudea ("Lies"), Logoi ("Stories"), Amphillogiai ("Disputes")
 Dysnomia ("Anarchy") and Ate ("Ruin"), near one another,
 and Horkos ("Oath"), who most afflicts men on earth,
 Then willing swears a false oath.

Hyginus'  account 
In another account, Pugna/ Hysmine was called daughter of the primordial deities Aether and Gaia.

 From Aether (Air) and Terra/ Gaia (Earth) [were born]: Dolor/ Algos (Pain), Dolus (Guile), Ira/ Lyssa (Anger), Luctus/ Penthus (Lamentation), Mendacium/ Pseudologoi (Lies), Jusjurandum/ Horcus (Oath), Ultio/ Poine (Vengeance), Intemperantia (Intemperance), Altercatio/ Amphillogiai (Altercation), Oblivio/ Lethe (Forgetfulness), Socordia/ Aergia (Sloth), Timor/ Phobos (Fear), Superbia (Arrogance), Incestum (Sacrilege), Pugna/ Hysminai (Combat).

Mythology 
Quintus Smyrnaeus depicted the Hysminae along with other daemons of war on the shield of Akhilleus.
And there were man-devouring wars, and all horrors of fight: slain men were falling down mid horse-hoofs; and the likeness of a plain blood-drenched was on that shield invincible. Phobos (Panic) was there, and Deimos (Dread), and ghastly Enyo with limbs all gore-bespattered hideously, and deadly Eris (Strife), and the Erinyes (Avenging Spirits) fierce-hearted -- she, still goading warriors on to the onset they, outbreathing breath of fire. Around them hovered the relentless Keres (Fates); beside them Hysminai (Battle) incarnate onward pressed welling, and from their limbs streamed blood and sweat. There were the ruthless Gorgons: through their hair horribly serpents coiled with flickering tongues. A measureless marvel was that cunning work of things that made men shudder to behold seeming as though they verily lived and moved.Quintus Smyrnaeus, Posthomerica 5.25–42

See also
 Androktasiai
 Machai

Notes

References 
 Gaius Julius Hyginus, Fabulae from The Myths of Hyginus translated and edited by Mary Grant. University of Kansas Publications in Humanistic Studies. Online version at the Topos Text Project.
 Hesiod, Theogony from The Homeric Hymns and Homerica with an English Translation by Hugh G. Evelyn-White, Cambridge, MA.,Harvard University Press; London, William Heinemann Ltd. 1914. Online version at the Perseus Digital Library. Greek text available from the same website.
 Quintus Smyrnaeus, The Fall of Troy translated by Way. A. S. Loeb Classical Library Volume 19. London: William Heinemann, 1913. Online version at theio.com
 Quintus Smyrnaeus, The Fall of Troy. Arthur S. Way. London: William Heinemann; New York: G.P. Putnam's Sons. 1913. Greek text available at the Perseus Digital Library.

Children of Eris (mythology)
War goddesses
Greek war deities
Greek goddesses
Personifications in Greek mythology